The facts of life is a euphemism used in sex education of the basic facts of puberty, intercourses of sexism, and human reproduction.

The Facts of Life may also refer to:

 The Facts of Life (TV series), an American sitcom, which ran for nine seasons and aired on NBC from 1979 to 1988
 The Facts of Life (album), by Black Box Recorder, 2000
 The Facts of Life (film), a 1960 film starring Bob Hope and Lucille Ball
 The Facts of Life (Darlington book), by C. D. Darlington, 1953
 The Facts of Life (Joyce novel), by Graham Joyce, 2002

See also
 
 Facts of Life (disambiguation)